Gatekeeping is the process of controlling the rate at which students progress to more advanced levels of study in the academic setting.  The term can also be more widely applied to refer to the social structures which test individuals for a certain level of understanding before allowing them to perform certain social function (e.g. medical education to become a medical doctor).

External links
 	Gatekeeping: A Model for Screening Baccalaureate Students for Field Education
 Cooking Up a Multi-Vocal Essay: Dinner Conversations about Teaching and Writing MVEs 
 Gate Keeping - Allowing All Children Access to Advanced Courses

Educational assessment and evaluation
Sociology of education